Gabriel Aynat (born 12 January 1972) is a Spanish former cyclist. He competed in two events at the 1992 Summer Olympics.

References

External links
 

1972 births
Living people
Spanish male cyclists
Olympic cyclists of Spain
Cyclists at the 1992 Summer Olympics
Sportspeople from Manacor
Cyclists from the Balearic Islands